This is a list of notable news agencies in Iran:

 KhabarOnline News Agency(Khabar online)
 AhlulBayt News Agency (ABNA)
 Cultural Heritage News Agency (CNA)
 Fars News Agency
 Eslahatnews
 Iranian Agriculture News Agency (IANA)
 Iran Book News Agency (IBNA)
 Iranian Cultural Heritage News Agency
 Iran's Metropolises News Agency (IMNA)
 Iranian Labour News Agency (ILNA)
 Iranian Students' News Agency (ISNA)
 Islamic Republic News Agency (IRNA)
 Islamic Republic of Iran Broadcasting (IRIB)
 Islamic Consultative Assembly News Agency (ICANA)
 Maritime News Agency of Iran (MANA)
 Mehr News Agency (MNA)
 Press TV
 Pupils Association News Agency (PANA)
 Tabnak
 Tasnim News Agency
 Gooya

See also
 Media of Iran
 International Rankings of Iran in Communication

Notes

Citations
List of journalists registered by Iranian Ministry of Islamic Culture and Guidance

News agencies